The 2018–19 La Salle Explorers basketball team represented La Salle University during the 2018–19 NCAA Division I men's basketball season. The Explorers, led by first-year head coach Ashley Howard, played their home games at Tom Gola Arena in Philadelphia, Pennsylvania as members of the Atlantic 10 Conference. They finished the season 10–21, 8–10 in A-10 play to finish in ninth place. They lost in the second round of the A-10 tournament to Rhode Island.

Previous season 
The Explorers finished the 2017–18 season 13–19, 7–11 in A-10 play to finish in a three-way tie for 10th place. As the No. 12 seed in the A-10 tournament, they lost in the first round to Massachusetts.

On March 23, 2018, head coach John Giannini and the school mutually agreed to part ways after 14 seasons. Giannini left with a 212–226 record at La Salle. On April 8, the school hired Villanova assistant Ashley Howard as head coach.

Offseason

Departures

Incoming transfers

2018 recruiting class

Roster

Schedule and results

|-
!colspan=9 style=| Non-conference regular season

|-
!colspan=9 style=|Atlantic 10 regular season

|-
!colspan=9 style=| Atlantic 10 tournament

Source

References

La Salle Explorers men's basketball seasons
La Salle
La Salle
La Salle